The Bright Mississippi is an album by the New Orleans Jazz and R&B pianist Allen Toussaint, released on Nonesuch Records in 2009. The album reached No. 8 on the Billboard Top Jazz Albums chart.

Background
The album was produced by Joe Henry and features various guest artists, including Brad Mehldau, Joshua Redman and Nicholas Payton. The album title is taken from the 1963 Thelonious Monk song of the same name and features a new version of the song. The album is a unique juxtaposition of modern and traditional jazz tunes with stylistic cues drawn from both worlds. In an interview shortly after it was released, Nick Spitzer noted that "there's a parade beat to it, a bit of a strut and shuffle. Are you merging the worlds of Monk and Toussaint?” “Well, there's no way around that,” Toussaint replied.

Though mostly known for R&B, this is Toussaint's second jazz album. The first was Allen Toussaint's Jazzity Project: Going Places, released online through cdbaby in 2004.

Critical reception

Critic Stephen Thomas Erlewine gave it a very favorable review on AllMusic, writing that it "stands alone among Toussaint albums".

Track listing
 "Egyptian Fantasy" (Sidney Bechet, John Reid) – 4:41
 "Dear Old Southland" (Raymond Bloch) – 6:19
 "St. James Infirmary" (Traditional) – 3:52
 "Singin’ the Blues" (Con Conrad, J. Russel Robinson) – 5:40
 "Whinin’ Boy Blues" (Jelly Roll Morton) – 6:42
 "West End Blues" (Joe Oliver, Clarence Williams) – 3:52
 "Blue Drag" (Django Reinhardt) – 4:22
 "Just a Closer Walk with Thee" (Traditional) – 5:11
 "Bright Mississippi" (Thelonious Monk) – 5:08
 "Day Dream" (Duke Ellington, Billy Strayhorn) – 5:27
 "Long, Long Journey" (Leonard Feather) – 4:51
 "Solitude" (Duke Ellington, Irving Mills, Eddie DeLange) – 5:31

Personnel

Allen Toussaint – piano and vocal
Don Byron – clarinet
Nicholas Payton – trumpet
Marc Ribot – acoustic guitar
David Piltch – upright bass
Jay Bellerose – drums and percussion
Brad Mehldau – piano
Joshua Redman – tenor saxophone

References

Allen Toussaint albums
2009 albums
Albums produced by Joe Henry
Nonesuch Records albums